Təzəkənd is a village and municipality in the Ismailli Rayon of Azerbaijan.  It has a population of 1,520.

References 

Populated places in Ismayilli District